Sticky skin syndrome or Acquired Cutaneous adherence is a condition where the skin becomes sticky and objects may adhere to it. It is occasionally caused by the use of pharmaceutical drugs and chemotherapy drugs.

Background
Sticky skin is a dermatologic condition where a person's skin may both stick to itself, and other objects. Sticky skin has been found in patients who take certain medications including retinoids or Antifungals. Also known as Acquired Cutaneous adherence, it can also be caused by the chemotherapy medication Doxorubicin and Ketoconazole.

See also
List of syndromes

References

Skin conditions resulting from physical factors
Syndromes affecting the skin